Public Opinion is a morning newspaper published seven days a week in the Greater Chambersburg area, including Franklin, Cumberland and Fulton counties PA.

The newspaper also publishes a weekly total market coverage product, The Advertiser, and a monthly Faith magazine.

History 

Since 1869, when the first edition came off a flatbed press in a Main Street building in downtown Chambersburg, Public Opinion has been a part of life in the Cumberland Valley, and the county's most comprehensive source of local news and information.

Public Opinion began as a weekly newspaper and then became a daily first published in the morning, but in 1921 it became an afternoon paper. By 1931, Public Opinion had bought two other newspapers with long histories in Franklin County, The Franklin Repository and Valley Spirit.

Corporate ownership 

Founded by M.A. Foltz, Public Opinion remained in the Foltz family until 1964, when it was purchased by McClure Newspapers.

In 1971, Public Opinion became the 27th newspaper owned by Gannett, which publishes USA Today and the weekly newspaper magazine USA Weekend, will be replaced by Parade (magazine). The latter is an insert in Public Opinion on Saturdays.

Public Opinion again became a morning newspaper in 2005, the same year that MediaNews Group Inc. took over controlling ownership as the newspaper's majority partner of the Texas-New Mexico Newspaper Partnership.

MediaNews, headquartered in Denver, Colo., is one of the nation's largest newspaper companies. It publishes 54 daily newspapers in 11 states.

The MediaNews Group-Gannett partnership includes three other south central Pennsylvania newspapers: the York Daily Record and York Sunday News, Lebanon Daily News, and The Evening Sun of Hanover, and newspapers in El Paso, Texas and New Mexico. However, in the Spring of 2015, speculation that Gannett would again take control of some of MediaNews Group's holdings, including the Pennsylvania papers, grew. Later in 2015, Gannett acquired full ownership of the Pennsylvania joint venture.

Today 
Public Opinions current home at North Third and East King streets was constructed about 1875 as a passenger station of the Cumberland Valley Railroad and served in that role until 1914. It was later used as a canteen for World War I soldiers passing through town and had a variety of manufacturing uses before 1956, when Public Opinion moved in.

In 2007, Public Opinion replaced its 50-year-old letterpress with a Goss Urbanite offset press, and also introduced a Sunday edition.

Today, the newspaper is Franklin County's largest daily newspaper, with a circulation of about 16,200 Mondays through Fridays and 18,000 Saturday/Sunday "Weekend Edition".

Public Opinions web site, www.publicopiniononline.com, provides 24/7 local, national and world news and sports, breaking news updates and news videos, local photo galleries, discussion forums, entertainment and classifieds, attracting more than 400,000 visitors each month.

Besides the daily edition and web site, Public Opinion offers its readers and advertisers a complete line of products, ranging from seasonal special sections to preprinted inserts (national coupon inserts on Saturdays).

Awards 
 Public Opinion is the recipient of the 1967 Pulitzer Prize for Journalism for Local General or Spot News Reporting.
 Robert V. Cox won the award for his reporting of a mountain manhunt that ended with the killing of a deranged gunman who had terrorized the community.  He also wrote the book Deadly Pursuit, which later was made into a television movie.

 2009 Pennsylvania Newspaper Association (Division IV)
 First Place - Editorial/Opinion Page Excellence
 First Place - Layout and Design
 Second Place - Best Use of Photography
 Second Place - Newspaper Promotion

 2009 Keystone Press Awards (Division V)
 First Place - Sports Story
 Honorable Mention - Feature Story

 2008 Keystone Press Awards (Division V)
 First Place - Editorial
 First Place - Sports Photo
 Second Place - Investigative Reporting
 Second Place - Special Project
 Second Place - Sports/Outdoor Column
 Honorable Mention - Sports Story

References

External links 

 

Gannett publications
Daily newspapers published in Pennsylvania
Chambersburg, Pennsylvania
Publications established in 1869
1869 establishments in Pennsylvania
Pulitzer Prize-winning newspapers